Bad Belzig, until 2010 Belzig, is a historic town in Brandenburg, Germany located about  southwest of Berlin. It is the capital of the Potsdam-Mittelmark district.

Geography

Bad Belzig is located within the Fläming hill range and in the centre of the High Fläming Nature Park. The plains north of the town are home to one of the few great bustard populations in Germany.

Since 2003, when 14 surrounding villages were incorporated into Bad Belzig, some of them voluntarily, others by Brandenburg Landtag (state parliament) legislation, Bad Belzig has an area of 234.83 km². These villages became districts (Ortsteile) of Belzig:

The forest of Verlorenwasser near Werbig encompassed the geographical centre of East Germany.

History
A Slavic fort of Belizi was first mentioned in a 997 deed issued by Emperor Otto III in favour of the Archbishopric of Magdeburg. Whether this denotation refers to Bad Belzig or the neighbouring town of Beelitz has not been conclusively established. Nevertheless, both towns celebrated their 1000 years anniversary in 1997.

The estates however had actually already been lost in the Slavic uprising of 983 and were not conquered again until 1153 by Albert the Bear from the House of Ascania. In 1251 the castle (Burg Eisenhardt) and the adjacent settlement became part of Saxe-Wittenberg under Albert's successor Duke Albert I. However it was claimed by the archbishops of Magdeburg, whose forces devastated Belzig in 1406. The rebuilt castle was again seized by the Hussite general Prokop the Great when he invaded Saxony in 1429, after which Elector Ernest of Saxony from the House of Wettin enlarged it to a fortress. During the Thirty Years' War it was seized by the troops of the Swedish Empire in 1636, after Elector John George I had allied with Emperor Ferdinand II in the Peace of Prague.

The Romanesque St Mary's Church was built in the late 13th century. According to an inscription in the keystone of the western entrance, Martin Luther preached here on January 14, 1530. Eisenhardt Castle. Bad Belzig was granted town privileges in 1702. During the War of the Sixth Coalition on August 27, 1813 troops of the French Empire and Saxony were attacked by Prussian and Russian forces near the village of Hagelberg. The encounter ended in a French defeat, while several Saxon units went over to the Prussians. According to the Final Act of the 1815 Congress of Vienna Bad Belzig was ceded to Prussia and became part of the Province of Brandenburg, after having belonged to the Saxon Electorate for centuries.

In 1934 ammunition works were established in Bad Belzig including a labor camp with about 1500 forced laborers. During the years 1936–1945, Burg Eisenhardt was the site of the Reichsschule (leadership school) for the Technischen Nothilfe ('technical emergency relief'). (The Technische Nothilfe was abolished in May, 1945, but the idea was revived by Otto Lummitzsch in the form of the Technisches Hilfswerk in 1950, which exists to this day as one of the pillars of the German civil protection infrastructure.) Between 1940 and 1945 a subcamp of the women's concentration camp Ravensbrück with about 750 inmates was also located nearby. Bad Belzig was also the site of a large radio transmitter station, erected in 1939. In 1952 the town became the capital of the Belzig district and in 1993 of the newly created district of Potsdam-Mittelmark. In 1995 Bad Belzig was awarded the official title of a climatic health resort. Effective March 2010, the town's name was changed to "Bad Belzig".

Demography

Politics

Mayors
 1990–2008: Peter Kiep (SPD)
 2008–2016: Hannelore Klabunde-Quast (independent)
 since 1. Dezember 2016: Roland Leisegang (independent)

Peter Kiep could work in office only till 2006. He died in 2013.

Hannelore Klabunde-Quast became in 2006 the substitute of Peter Kiep. She was elected mayor in 2008.

Roland Leisegang (a founding member of the band Keimzeit) was elected mayor in 2016 with 65,4 % of the votes.

The municipal assembly (Stadtverordnetenversammlung) has 22 members. The 2014 elections showed the following results: 
Social Democrats (SPD): 6 seats
Left Party (Die Linke): 3 seats
Christian Democrats (CDU): 3 seats
"We, the villagers" group: 3 seats
Free Voters: 2 seats
Grüne: 2 seats
Liberals (FDP): 1 seat
NPD: 1 seat
Belzig Business Association: 1 seat

The town's shield depicts the coat of arms of Saxony due to the long-time affiliation with the Saxon Electorate.

International relations

Bad Belzig is twinned with Ritterhude, a town in the German state of Lower Saxony, and is also twinned with Workington, a town in Cumbria, England.

Bad Belzig exchanges students with Even Yehuda, Israel. Yet, there is not official agreement between the cities.

Places of interest
Main attractions are medieval Eisenhardt castle and the thermal bath SteinTherme. There is also a picturesque historic town centre with the town hall and the market place in the middle.

Places of interest in the incorporated villages include Glien Manor (Klein Glien) in Hagelberg and the windmill in Borne.

There is also a set of sculpture walks starting from Bad Belzig, heading towards Wiesenburg.

Economy
The district administration is the major employer in Bad Belzig.

Bad Belzig is the main town in the rural Higher Fläming area, with schools, shops, supermarkets, a hospital and a cinema all used by the inhabitants of surrounding towns and villages.

There is a successful rehabilitation clinic (sanatorium) in Bad Belzig.

In 1989, Bad Belzig launched an ambitious programme to become a spa town (achieving recognition in 2009) and promote tourism.

Sons and daughters of the town
 Carl Gottlieb Reißiger (1798-1859), composer and Kapellmeister in Dresden
 Joachim Herrmann (1932-2010), prehistorian, born in Lübnitz
 Matthias Rudolph (born 1982), football coach and player
 Felix Holzner (born 1985), football player
 Fabian Wiede (born 1994), handball player

References

External links

official website 
official website of the Tourist Board 
Stein Therme - thermal bath 
High Fläming Nature Park 

Spa towns in Germany
Localities in Potsdam-Mittelmark
Fläming Heath